Richard Lewis Hearne  (30 January 1908 – 23 August 1979) was an English actor, comedian, producer and writer. He is best remembered for his stage and television character Mr Pastry.

Career
Hearne was born in Norwich, Norfolk, in 1908, the son of Richard and Lily May Hearne. Richard senior came from a theatrical family – his mother had been on the stage and he himself was a performing acrobat. Hearne worked on and off for the BBC for thirty years; he became the first performer to be known as a "television star" and also the first to have his own television series. The series, with the theme tune "Pop Goes The Weasel", had episodes lasting 25 minutes in which Hearne assumed the character of "Mr Pastry" – an old man with a walrus moustache, dressed in a black suit or raincoat and with a trademark bowler hat. Each week, the bumbling old man would have adventures, partly slapstick, partly comic dance, with two young friends. Jon Pertwee also starred in the show in a variety of roles.

The Mr Pastry character had originated in the 1936 stage show Big Boy in which Hearne had appeared with Fred Emney. A Mr Pastry film was subsequently made but portrayed the lead character as a pathetic figure coming out of prison and totally different from the TV series' bumbling comic.

His act first appeared on the US Ed Sullivan Show in 1954, and thereafter Hearne appeared on the show frequently. Buster Keaton was reportedly a fan. Hearne was the subject of This Is Your Life in 1959 when he was surprised by Eamonn Andrews at the BBC Television Theatre. In 1963, Hearne became President of the Lord's Taverners charity and he subsequently raised money for hundreds of hydrotherapy pools. In 1970, he was awarded an OBE for his charitable work.

He was interviewed for the starring role of the BBC series Doctor Who after the departure of Jon Pertwee, but a disagreement over his interpretation of the role (he wanted to play the Doctor as Mr Pastry) led to no offer being made by the producer, Barry Letts. The role was subsequently offered to Tom Baker. In 1976, he appeared as Mr. Pastry on the BBC's old time music hall show, The Good Old Days.

Hearne died in Bearsted, Kent, in 1979, aged 71, leaving a widow, Yvonne (née Ortner), and two children. He was buried in the churchyard in the village of St. Mary's Platt, near Borough Green in Kent. He had lived at Platt Farm, a fifteenth-century property in Long Mill Lane in the village, from the 1940s, and ran a market garden there.

Filmography

References

External links

 
 Article at Whirligig-tv.co.uk
 "Hearne At Home Aka Mr Pastry 1957" at British Pathe
 "Mr Pastry At The Circus (1960)" at British Pathe

1908 births
1979 deaths
English male comedians
People from Norwich
Officers of the Order of the British Empire
20th-century English male actors
People from Bearsted
20th-century English comedians
Burials in Kent